Hnat Martynovych Khotkevych (also Gnat Khotkevich or Hnat Khotkevych, born December 31, 1877 – died October 8, 1938) was a Ukrainian writer, ethnographer, playwright, composer, musicologist, and bandurist.

Khotkevych was a renaissance man and was multi-talented. Although he was trained as a professional engineer, he is known more as a prolific Ukrainian literary figure, and also as a dramatist, composer and ethnographer, and father of the modern bandura.

Early life and education 
Khotkevych was born in Kharkiv in 1877. His mother was a domestic worker, though little is known about his father, who left the family in the mid-1880s. As a youth he learned to play the piano and violin and later learned to play the bandura through observing the blind folk kobzars of the region. He completed his tertiary studies in engineering at the Kharkiv Polytechnic Institute in 1900, and then worked as a railway engineer.

Literature 
Khotkevych began writing as a student, and had his first story published in 1897, "The Georgian lady". Later there appeared "The Prodigal Son" (1898), "Analogies of Life" (1901), and "Mountain Aquarelles" (1914). His first major successful work was a novel about life in the Carpathian mountains, The Stone Soul, which was published in 1911. Other novels followed: Aviron (1928), Berestechko, and Tarasyk. An eight-volume collection of his writing was published in 1928; many of his unpublished works have been lost.

Khotkevych incorporated original folkloric and ethnographic material, in particular folk songs, tales, customs and even dialectical and lingual differences of the region or time which he was writing about. He included many aspects of the modernist style popular in Ukraine at the time.

English Translations 
English translations of Hnat Khotkevych's works include:
 Short stories: “The Hunger Strike”, “In a Free Country p. 260”, “The Three”, “Facing the Door” and “It Had To Be Thus”.<ref>Khotkevych, B., 1998, '[http://www.languagelanterns.com/brother.htm 'Brother against Brother], pp.252-293, Language Lantern Publications, Toronto, (Engl. transl.</ref>

 Theatre 

As a youth he had the chance of seeing a number of theatrical performances in Kharkiv. He was so taken by these performances that in the summers he organized a theatre in the village of Derkachi for the peasants.

In 1903 he organized a Ukrainian workers theatre in Kharkiv which was also hugely successful. He produced and wrote over 50 plays. Because his activities addressed social and national issues, he was forced to emigrate in 1905 to Halychyna (part of Western Ukraine) which at that time, was under Austro-Hungarian rule.

In 1910 whilst in Halychyna he once again organized a theatrical troupe made up of illiterate Hutsuls who had great success touring Western Ukraine performing the ethnographic plays he had created.

In 1912 he returned to Kharkiv and after being released from incarceration renewed the activities of the Kharkiv Ukrainian Theatre until his internal exile to Russia in 1914.

He continued writing plays, the most interesting was the work Bohdan Khmelnytsky which chronicle the life and times of the renowned Kozak leader in the mid 17th century.

In 1936 he played the role in the film Nazar Stodolya, which appeared in 1937, but after being shown briefly for two weeks was removed from showings.

Khotkevych wrote a number of studies on the history of theatre in Ukraine such as "The Folk Theatre in Galicia", and "The Theatre in 1848".

 Music 
As a student Khotkevych became well known for his bandura playing. He first purchased an instrument in 1894, and first performed on stage as a soloist in 1896. When he was expelled from the Kharkiv Polytechnical Institute he joined Mykola Lysenko's touring choir as a bandura soloist. At a young age he was renowned as a virtuoso of the bandura.

In 1902, he was asked to read a paper on the music and traditions of the folk bandurists known as kobzars at the XIIth Archeological Conference held in Kharkiv in 1902. He prepared a paper and also organized a concert which became the first performance of a bandura ensemble in history. During the congress, he was one of the initiators of the idea of the preservation of kobzar music by means of sound recording using recently invented phonograph.

Since that time this art-form became hugely popular throughout Ukraine.

After emigrating to Austria-Hungary in 1906 he traversed Halychyna with solo recitals of bandura music. In 1907, he wrote the first bandura handbook which was published in 1909 in Lviv.

In 1910, he had one of his bandura compositions – "Odarochka" – published in Kiev which became the first composition published for the instrument. He returned to Central Ukraine in 1912 and was soon arrested, jailed and later exiled to Russia. He returned to Kharkiv only in 1917 where he taught Ukrainian Literature and Language at the Kharkiv Zoological College.

In 1920 he organised a Ukrainian choir that performed ethnographic choral works and in the 1920s had numerous compositions published.

From 1926 on, he taught the first conservatory level courses in bandura at the Kharkiv Music and Drama Institute. A new textbook for the bandura was partially published (the 3 final books were lost at the publishing house). A collection of his compositions for the bandura was prepared but was also lost by the publishing house. Only a handful of students completed these courses such as Leonid Haydamaka, O. Herashchenko, O. Hayevsky, I. Oleshko, and Hryhory Bazhul. Most were arrested in the early 1930s, however some found their way out to the West during World War II.

In 1928, Khotkevych became the director of a special bandura studio, organized to retrain and convert the Poltava Bandurist Capella to play in the Kharkiv style. He composed and arranged numerous works for this ensemble. In 1931 the ensemble received the privilege of being the first Soviet ensemble to be invited to tour North America. Unfortunately, the tour did not take place and Khotkevych was removed from the directorship of the ensemble in 1932. All of his pieces and arrangements being subsequently banned.

Apart from his musical performance and compositions, Khotkevych also produced a number of books on Ukrainian folk instruments, and the bandura specifically. These books were openly criticised in the Soviet press and also banned from 1932.

 Persecution 
As an ethnographer he saw the type of persecution that blind kobzars suffered from Tsarist police whenever they visited the city. He was persecuted by Tsarist authorities because of his association with Ukrainian culture and the bandura. He was removed from studies in 1899, and in 1905 was forced to emigrate.

When he returned from Austria-Hungary he was followed by police and incarcerated, and with the outbreak of World War I was forced into internal exile to Russia.

From 1928 Khotkevych again had difficulties in all his publishing endeavours. Initially, manuscripts began to disappear at publishing houses and in the mail. Works had to be submitted three or four times, and then they were often sabotaged in the publishing houses. Khotkevych wrote numerous letters to complain, but little was done.

From 1931, he suffered numerous personal attacks in the Soviet press, which ultimately resulted in all his music and writing being banned in 1932 and him losing all employment.

In 1933 his family starved during the Holodomor, as he was not given ration cards because he was officially unemployed. In 1934 someone tried to kill him by pushing him under the wheels of a train. As a result, he was hospitalised for a period with moderately severe injuries to his leg.

In February 1938, during the Great Purge, he was arrested and tortured. In 1938 an NKVD tribunal in Kharkiv sentenced him to be shot and his property confiscated. The execution was carried out on 8 October 1938 and his body was buried in a mass grave on the outskirts of Kharkiv.

Soviet sources initially falsely stated that he was sent to Siberia for 10 years without the right to correspond. False death certificates were issued to state that he died in 1943.

 Postmortem 
Khotkevych was politically rehabilitated by the Soviet government in 1956; however, only a small part of his literary output was republished. In 1977, despite being on a UNESCO list of noted cultural figures to be commemorated, nothing was published.

In post-1991 Ukraine numerous works by this author have been republished and many manuscripts have found their way from the archives into publications due mainly to the efforts of the Khotkevych foundation in Kharkiv.

In 1989 a film was made after the Khotkevytch book Kaminna dusha''. directed by Stanislav Klymenko. A documentary about Khokevych's life "Sledovat' na sever mozhet'" was made in 1991.

See also 
Hnat Khotkevych Ukrainian Bandurist Ensemble

References 

1877 births
1938 deaths
Writers from Kharkiv
People from Kharkov Governorate
Ukrainian composers
Kobzarstvo
Ukrainian male short story writers
Ukrainian short story writers
Soviet art historians
Soviet male writers
20th-century male writers
Ukrainian people executed by the Soviet Union
Ukrainian language activists
Ukrainian ethnographers
Ukrainian music educators
Soviet rehabilitations
Executed Ukrainian people
Kharkiv Polytechnic Institute alumni
Ukrainian novelists
Ukrainian people of Polish descent
Musicians from Kharkiv
Writers from the Russian Empire